Vautrin is a fictional character from the novels of French writer Honoré de Balzac in the La Comédie humaine series..

People 
Vautrin is the French family name. It is from a pet form of the personal name Vautier, a regional variant of Gauthier.

Catherine Vautrin (born 1960), French politician
Claire Vautrin (1917–1995), French sprint canoer
Irénée Vautrin (1888–1974), Canadian politician from Quebec
Jean Vautrin (1933–2015), French writer
Minnie Vautrin (1886–1941), American missionary renowned for saving the lives of many women at the Ginling Girls College in Nanjing, China, during the Nanking Massacre

Awards 
Vautrin Lud Prize, the highest award in the field of geography

Surnames of French origin